Denis Javier Meléndez Rosales (born 22 July 1995) is a Honduran professional footballer who plays as a midfielder for Vida in the Honduran Liga Nacional.

Career 
Meléndez made his professional debut with C.D. Victoria in a 4–0 Liga Nacional loss to C.D. Olimpia on 27 February 2016.

Personal life
Denis' brother, Carlos Meléndez, is also a professional footballer.

References

External links
 

1995 births
Living people
People from La Ceiba
Honduran footballers
Association football midfielders
C.D. Victoria players
C.D.S. Vida players
Liga Nacional de Fútbol Profesional de Honduras players